Oye is a 2006 album by Aterciopelados. The album won the 2007 Latin Grammy Award for Best Alternative Music Album, as well as the Lo Nuestro Award in best rock category, and Nuestra Tierra (2008) for the best rock group and best rock song for Canción protesta.

Track listing

References

External links

2006 albums
Aterciopelados albums